Jason Ballesteros (born October 7, 1985) is a Filipino professional basketball player for Koponang Lakan ng Bulacan of the Pilipinas Super League. He was drafted seventh by the Meralco Bolts in the 2011 PBA draft.  He has also played for Smart Gilas.

College career
Ballesteros played college basketball for the San Sebastian Stags where he became the team's starting center. While playing for San Sebastian, he was known as one of NCAA Philippines' top defensive players, winning the Defensive Player of the Year award twice, in 2007 and 2008. He also made the league's Mythical Five team in his final season in 2008.

Professional career
Ballesteros was drafted by Meralco Bolts seventh overall in the 2011 PBA draft that also featured his former Smart Gilas teammates.

Weeks before the start of the 38th PBA season, he was traded to Barako Bull in exchange for Carlo Sharma and 3-point bomber Sunday Salvacion.

In February 2014, San Miguel Beermen signed Ballesteros to a two-year deal, but never played a game for them and was released before the Governors' Cup. The Meralco Bolts re-signed him for the rest of the season.

On September 12, 2014, he and Salvacion were sent to Blackwater Elite in a three-way trade involving NLEX Road Warriors and Meralco Bolts. NLEX obtained Blackwater's 2016 and 2017 2nd round pick along with the draft rights for Juneric Baloria. Meralco received Sean Anthony from NLEX via Blackwater as third party.

On March 20, 2016, Ballesteros was traded to Mahindra Enforcer for Kyle Pascual.

International career
Ballesteros played for Smart Gilas, the Philippine national team, and was one of the Smart Gilas' pioneers. Of all the big men from the first Gilas team, he stayed with the team the longest, from its creation in 2008 until 2011, when he was drafted to the PBA.

PBA career statistics

As of the end of 2020 season

Season-by-season averages

|-
| align=left | 
| align=left | Meralco
| 16 || 8.7 || .400 || .000 || .222 || 2.8 || .1 || .0 || .3 || .9
|-
| align=left | 
| align=left | Barako Bull
| 9 || 10.3 || .300 || .000 || .500 || 3.9 || .1 || .1 || .8 || 1.9
|-
| align=left | 
| align=left | Meralco
| 3 || 12.7 || .667 || .000 || .778 || 2.3 || .7 || .7 || .3 || 3.7
|-
| align=left | 
| align=left | Blackwater
| 27 || 14.0 || .518 || .000 || .667 || 4.4 || .5 || .5 || .7 || 2.4
|-
| align=left | 
| align=left | Blackwater / Mahindra
| 29 || 12.5 || .575 || .000 || .464 || 4.0 || .2 || .2 || .8 || 2.3
|-
| align=left | 
| align=left | Mahindra / Kia
| 32 || 15.5 || .477 || .000 || .727 || 4.3 || .2 || .1 || .7 || 1.8
|-
| align=left | 
| align=left | Meralco
| 20 || 11.8 || .538 || .000 || .800 || 4.1 || .2 || .1 || .6 || 1.8
|-class=sortbottom
| align=center colspan=2 | Career
| 136 || 12.8 || .498 || .000 || .592 || 4.0 || .2 || .2 || .6 || 2.0

References

1985 births
Living people
Basketball players at the 2010 Asian Games
Basketball players from Pangasinan
Blackwater Bossing players
Centers (basketball)
Filipino men's basketball players
Terrafirma Dyip players
Meralco Bolts players
San Sebastian Stags basketball players
Ilocano people
Asian Games competitors for the Philippines
Meralco Bolts draft picks